Robert Markuš (Serbian Cyrillic: Роберт Маркуш, Hungarian: Róbert Márkus; born October 7, 1983) is a Serbian chess Grandmaster.

His current FIDE rating is 2672 and he is a member of Novi Sad Chess Club.
Markuš played for the Serbian Olympic team in 37th Chess Olympiad.

External links
 

1983 births
Chess grandmasters
Living people
Serbian chess players